Arthur Allan Thomas (born 2 January 1938) is a New Zealand man who was granted a Royal Pardon and compensation after being wrongfully convicted of the murders of Harvey and Jeannette Crewe in June 1970. Thomas was married and farming a property in the Pukekawa district, south of Auckland before the case. Following the revelation that the crucial evidence against him had been faked, Thomas was pardoned in 1979 and awarded NZ$950,000 in compensation for his 9 years in prison and loss of earnings.

Campaign to overturn the convictions 
There were numerous inconsistencies in the evidence, which led to an outcry among elements in the farming community and among relatives of Thomas and his wife, Vivien Thomas. That led to the formation of the Arthur Thomas Retrial Committee.

The report by a retired judge, Sir George MacGregor, which rejected the appeal for a retrial, was also riddled with inconsistencies and inaccuracies. However, a report on that by journalist Terry Bell, then deputy editor of the Auckland Star Saturday edition, was rejected for publication on the grounds that "it is not the role of the newspapers to attempt to try the courts". Bell then resigned and produced the booklet Bitter Hill, which is the English meaning of Pukekawa, outlining inconsistencies in the prosecution's case and the theory advanced by the retrial committee. It provided the impetus for a national campaign that eventually led to a controversial retrial where the jury was housed incommunicado with police in a local hotel. Thomas was again convicted.

Pat Booth, the assistant editor of the Auckland Star, attended the retrial and became concerned. As part of the campaign for a pardon, Booth wrote a book, Trial by Ambush. That was followed by another campaigning book, Beyond Reasonable Doubt, by British investigative author David Yallop, which was subsequently made into a film of the same name.

Thomas received a pardon, and a Royal Commission report explicitly stated that detectives had used ammunition and a rifle taken from his farm to fabricate false evidence against him. A 2014 police review of the case acknowledged police misconduct was probably the explanation for the key evidence against Thomas: a spent cartridge case.

Royal Commission of inquiry 

A Royal Commission of Inquiry was established, headed by retired New South Wales Justice Robert Taylor. It declared Thomas to have been wrongfully charged and convicted and found that among other improprieties, police had planted a .22 rifle cartridge case in the garden of the house in which the murders were committed. The case was found four months and ten days after the area had already been subjected to one of the most intensive police searches ever undertaken. The cartridge case was said to have come from a rifle belonging to Thomas.  However, the police tested only 64 rifles in an area where this weapon was common and found that two, including the one belonging to Thomas – could have fired the cartridge case found in the garden. That was the link to the deaths of the Crewes although it was later admitted that the case was "clean" and uncorroded when it was found. As such, the condition of the case was inconsistent with having lain in the garden, exposed to weather and dirt for more than four months.

No action against police officers 
The commission report said: "Mr Hutton and Mr [Len] Johnston planted the shell case... and they did so to manufacture evidence that Mr Thomas' rifle had been used for the killings." The Solicitor-General recommended against prosecuting the officers because of insufficient evidence. An independent review of the 2014 police review by David PH Jones QC, released on 30 July 2014, concluded "In my view, there was sufficient evidence for a prosecution to have been taken against Bruce Hutton based on the available material".

Subsequent events 

In 2009 Arthur Allan Thomas travelled to Christchurch to support David Bain, who also had criminal convictions against him overturned. In 2010 he collaborated with investigative journalist Ian Wishart on the book Arthur Allan Thomas, where for the first time he gave his perspective on his life, from before the murders to the present.

The two detectives who planted the shell that helped convict Thomas are now dead. Johnston died in 1978. Bruce Hutton, 83, died in Middlemore Hospital in April 2013. At Hutton's funeral, Deputy Commissioner Mike Bush praised Mr Hutton and said he was known for having "integrity beyond reproach". An editorial in the New Zealand Herald said: "that was clearly absurd. It was also an unthinking or calculated insult to Mr Thomas, who spent nine years in prison before being pardoned". Thomas, then age 75, responded by saying the police were engaged in "a blatant cover up". A police review of the original investigation, at a cost of $400,000 to New Zealand taxpayers, released in July 2014, cleared all other suspects and implied that Arthur Thomas remained a police suspect. The independent review by David PH Jones QC concluded that "It does not appear that there was any real inquiry by the 1970 investigation team into any persons other than Arthur Thomas".

Rape and sexual assault trial 

In late 2019 Thomas, then aged 81, faced one charge of rape and four of indecent assault against two women. He previously pleaded not guilty and elected trial by jury. His case was called at Manukau District Court, where he was excused from attending; Judge Charles Blackie lifted suppression orders that previously prevented the media from reporting anything about the case. On 15 December 2020 at Papakura District Court, Thomas's lawyers asked that the charges be dismissed. Judge John Bergseng suppressed argument details of the hearing out of fair trial interests.

The trial opened 14 June 2021 at Manukau District Court, with Aaron Perkins for the Crown and Marie Dyhrberg, QC, for the defence. Judge Jon Bergseng presided. Thomas was now aged 83. One complainant alleged she was raped and indecently assaulted; the other alleged she was indecently assaulted three times. Both witnesses said there were others present when some of the alleged offending took place. A third witness claimed Thomas had encouraged him to participate in the alleged acts. Full trial details were heavily suppressed. The Defence claimed the charges were fabricated and motivated by money. Thomas's former solicitor, Chris Reid, told the court he organised a legal meeting on behalf of Thomas with the complainants and their husbands. Among those present were Reid's cousin, Thomas's then-lawyer Peter Williams, and former prime minister David Lange. Reid testified that the complainants made demands for Thomas pay them money: 
"If he didn't, they were going to complain to the police about sexual abuse of one sort or another." One complainant said that Thomas' 2019 petition for an apology "was the straw that broke the camel's back" and why she finally went to the police over the alleged sex offending.  

Reid said Williams told the complainants the meeting had to take place according to law, the threat could have constituted extortion, and recommended the complainants get independent legal advice. According to Reid, Lange also advised the complainants to go to the police. Three other witnesses testified for the Defence, including Thomas's second wife. Thomas himself did not testify. In her closing address, Dyhrberg called the man's testimony "the stuff of fantasy"; he himself could not rely upon his own memory. She said the two women had not told the truth, and "it's gotten out of control".  In his closing address, Perkins said, “It is far-fetched in the extreme that two women would come along and commit perjury." In summing up, Judge Bergseng told the jury that each charge must be considered separately, with a focus on the evidence specific to each one. But caution was required because the passage of time meant memories of some witnesses may have faded, making it impossible to check some of the witnesses' testimony, and also causing Thomas to lose "the ability to call witnesses who could support his defence". The jury failed to reach a verdict and was discharged on 28 June 2021.

On 14 October 2021 Crown Prosecutor Charlie Piho told the Manukau District Court the Crown wished to continue with the prosecution. Judge Mina Wharepouri set a trial date for November 2022. However, in September 2022, a stay of prosecution was ordered in response to Thomas now being considered unfit to stand trial due to deteriorating mental health. This in effect ended the prosecution by putting it on hold indefinitely.

See also
Beyond Reasonable Doubt, a 1982 film about the conviction of Thomas
Crime in New Zealand

References

Further reading

External links
Article by Pat Booth in the New Zealand Listener
Report urging Police to reopen the case in 2006 Based on Chris Birt's investigation into the identity of the unknown woman.
Report of the Royal Commission to Inquire into the Circumstances of the Convictions of Arthur Allan Thomas for the Murders of David Harvey Crewe and Jeanette Lenore Crewe 1980
Investigative journalist Pat Booth 40 years on from the Crewe Murders and what he thinks really happened

Living people
Overturned convictions in New Zealand
New Zealand farmers
People from the Auckland Region
1938 births
People convicted of murder by New Zealand
Place of birth missing (living people)
New Zealand people convicted of murder
People wrongfully convicted of murder
Recipients of New Zealand royal pardons